Immo Huhtinen (30 August 1932 – 1 June 1998) was a Finnish sports shooter. He competed at the 1964, 1968 and the 1972 Summer Olympics.

References

1932 births
1998 deaths
Finnish male sport shooters
Olympic shooters of Finland
Shooters at the 1964 Summer Olympics
Shooters at the 1968 Summer Olympics
Shooters at the 1972 Summer Olympics
Sportspeople from Vyborg
20th-century Finnish people